Team Hezeberg Powered By Reaume Brothers Racing was a European-American professional stock car racing team that competed part-time in the NASCAR Cup Series, fielding the No. 26 Toyota Camry TRD for Daniil Kvyat and the No. 27 Ford Mustang GT for Loris Hezemans and Jacques Villeneuve.

Cup Series

Car No. 26 history 

On July 2, 2022, it was rumored that former Formula One driver, Daniil Kvyat, would be aiming for a NASCAR road course start. He attended the Cup Series race at Road America as a guest for the team. During an interview with FS1 reporter, Bob Pockrass, Kvyat stated that “This is different but a very fascinating world for me. I always really liked NASCAR and was very curious about it. In fact, I was at Martinsville last year to watch the race, now this year I came to look for opportunities to race here. I think something might come alive very soon, hopefully, and soon you will see me in a NASCAR Cup car.” To prepare, Kvyat tested a late model car for Reaume Brothers Racing at Hickory Motor Speedway.

The team entered Kvyat into the 2022 Verizon 200 at the Brickyard with the No. 26 Toyota Camry. It would be their second entry into the race.  Kvyat has driven a No. 26 car before, as he had chosen 26 as his career number in Formula 1.

Car No. 26 results

Car No. 27 history

2022 

On October 9, 2021, NASCAR Whelen Euro Series champion Loris Hezemans, and NASCAR Camping World Truck Series Owner-Driver Josh Reaume announced the formation of Team Hezeberg, and will compete in a partial schedule for the 2022 NASCAR Cup Series, and are hoping to go full-time in 2023. The team is owned by Loris' father, former racer Toine Hezemans, Dutch entrepreneur Ernst Berg, and NASCAR Camping World Truck Series Owner-Driver Josh Reaume. Hezeberg Systems, the family company owned by Toine Hezemans, will be the primary sponsor for the team. Jacques Villeneuve, 1995 IndyCar champion and 1997 Formula 1 World Champion who made his last NASCAR start in 2013, will be returning to the NASCAR Cup Series in 2022 to drive for select races next season. The team will have prepared cars from Reaume Brothers Racing, owned by Josh Reaume. Villeneuve will take part in the Daytona Next Gen test for Team Hezeberg on the 11th January, 2022. On January 12, 2022, it was announced that Villeneuve will be attempting to make the 2022 Daytona 500 for the team, which would be his first NASCAR start since 2013. Villeneuve would officially make the Daytona 500 after qualifying on speed. On 17th February 2022, Jacques Villeneuve missed the warm up laps of the Vacations Duel Race #2. The cause of the absence was a broken gas cable. The team had sufficient time to fix the problem and Villeneuve rejoined the grid for the start of the race. Unfortunately, Villeneuve was unable to keep pace and abandoned the race with 20 laps remaining. Villeneuve went on to finish 22nd in the Daytona 500 itself, while Hezemans drove the car in the road course races at Circuit of the Americas, Road America, and Indianapolis Motor Speedway.

Car No. 27 results

References

External links 

NASCAR teams
Stock car racing